Bodo Ramelow (born 16 February 1956) is a German politician who has served since 4 March 2020 as Minister-President of Thuringia, an office he previously held from 2014 to 5 February 2020. He is the first head of a German state government to serve non-consecutive terms in office since Eberhard Diepgen, who served twice as Governing Mayor of Berlin (1984–1989 and 1991–2001). A member of The Left, he previously chaired the party's group in the Landtag of Thuringia. On 8 October 2021, he was elected to a one-year term as President of the Bundesrat. His term lasted from 1 November 2021 until 31 October 2022.

Political career
Ramelow was born and raised in West Germany. He is a trained retail salesman and became an official in Gewerkschaft Handel, Banken und Versicherungen (HBV), the union for trade, bank and insurance employees during the 1980s. He moved to Thuringia, in former East Germany, after the unification of Germany in 1990. There he joined the  successor to the  SED - the East German Communist Party, the  Party of Democratic Socialism (PDS). He was elected to the Landtag of Thuringia in 1999. He became deputy chairman and in 2001 chairman of the party's parliamentary group in the Landtag (state parliament).

In February 2004, Ramelow was elected top candidate of the PDS in the Thuringian state elections. In June 2004 the party gained its best result in Thuringia since German unification with 26.1% of the votes. Ramelow was re-elected as the PDS chairman in Thuringia.

Starting in June 2005, Ramelow was chief negotiator during unification talks between the PDS and WASG, a unification that resulted in the new party The Left. In September 2005 he was elected deputy chairman of The Left in the Bundestag. In the Thuringia state election in September 2009 he led The Left to become the second biggest party with 27.4% of the votes, making him a competitor for the post of minister president.

Illegal observation by the Verfassungsschutz
In 2003 it became publicly known that Germany's domestic intelligence service, the Bundesamt für Verfassungsschutz, had been observing Ramelow and had opened a file on him because of his alleged contacts with the German Communist Party (DKP) during the 1980s. Supposedly the observation had stopped following Ramelow's entry into the Landtag in 1999, but in May 2006 the Administrative court of Weimar decreed that the Thuringian State Verfassungsschutz had to reveal the file and the stored data. It became known that the federal Verfassungsschutz had observed Ramelow for many years. Ramelow sued the authorities, but in 2010 the Federal Administrative Court of Germany ruled that the Verfassungsschutz is entitled to observe politicians of the Left Party due to "reasonable suspicion of anti-constitutional activity".

This ruling was overturned in 2013 by the Federal Constitutional Court, which decided that the monitoring had been illegal. It stated that monitoring lawmakers may be acceptable, but only in exceptional circumstances, "if there is an indication that a legislator has abused his or her mandate in the fight against the democratic constitutional order, or actively or aggressively fought against that order." The court found no grounds to suspect Ramelow, who is considered one of the more moderate voices within his party. The decision was widely seen as a major victory for Ramelow's party as well.

Minister President of Thuringia

Following elections in September 2014, Ramelow was elected by the Landtag as Minister President of Thuringia on 5 December 2014 with the support of the Social Democratic Party and the Greens, which had joined the Left in a coalition. This vote, which Ramelow won in the second round, marked the first time the Left had won the leadership of any of Germany's states since the reunification of Germany in 1990.

Ramelow's government lost its majority in the 2019 state election, though his party moved into first place for the first time in any German state. Government formation was complicated by the major success of The Left and the far-right Alternative for Germany (AfD), who between them held a majority. All major parties had pledged their opposition to working with AfD, while the CDU, FDP, and AfD refused to work with The Left. On 5 February 2020, Ramelow was defeated in the Landtag election for Minister President after AfD voted with the FDP and CDU to elect FDP leader Thomas Kemmerich. After it surfaced that Kemmerich may have cooperated with AfD leader Björn Höcke to win the election, Ramelow published a tweet with a photo of Adolf Hitler shaking hands with Paul von Hindenburg during his inauguration as Chancellor alongside a photo of Höcke shaking hands with Kemmerich. The tweet also included a 1930 statement from Hitler about the Nazi Party's position as kingmaker after the 1929 Thuringian election.

In February 2020, Ramelow was criticized because a tweet from the year 2012 surfaced where he posted a photograph of the Soviet Premier Joseph Stalin and commented "Comrade Stalin ;-)".

On 4 March, Ramelow was again elected as Minister President by the Landtag due to the abstentions of the CDU and FDP. After the vote, he refused to shake the hand of Björn Höcke, leader of the Thuringian AfD.

During the COVID-19 pandemic in Germany, Ramelow became one of Germany's most prominent critics of lockdowns. Under Ramelow, Thuringia was the first state to lift restrictions following the first wave, and Ramelow resisted lockdown measures requested by Angela Merkel during the second wave in late Autumn and the run-up to Christmas. In January, as Thuringia became Germany's worst affected state, Ramelow announced that he regretted this decision and now supported a hard lockdown.

References

External links

1956 births
Living people
People from Osterholz
Members of the Bundestag for Thuringia
Members of the Landtag of Thuringia
Ministers-President of Thuringia
Party of Democratic Socialism (Germany) politicians
Members of the Bundestag 2005–2009
Members of the Bundestag for The Left
Presidents of the German Bundesrat